Distributed learning is an instructional model that allows instructor, students, and content to be located in different, noncentralized locations so that instruction and learning can occur independent of time and place. The distributed learning model can be used in combination with traditional classroom-based courses and traditional distance education courses (in which it is also deferred to as blended learning, or it can be used to create entirely virtual classrooms.)

There is much confusion globally over distinctions between and definitions of distributed learning, distance education, open learning, e-learning, blended learning and other related terms. Many terms are used more commonly in particular geographies.  Distinctions can arise when the chosen model focuses on either or both time and geographic distances.  Distributed learning may be dependent on time if it includes synchronous sessions, and further time dependent if the course is paced. The oldest and most commonly used of these terms, distance education, can be used to describe distributed learning as defined above. "Distributed education" lacks a correspondence school tone and history and thus is perceived as making more use of communications and especially synchronous communications technologies. Further research using both terms "distance" and "distributed education" returns better results, with considerable overlap.

Distributed learning is a viable option for many individuals of all ages who desire to get an education. It holds a number of advantages and a traditional learning environment.

Advantages
 Opportunities to study
 Networking
 Pace
 Schedules
 Money
 Travelling
 Selection of Professors
 Numerous choices for schools
 No classroom setting
 Effective
 Learning while working
 Flexibility
 Cost-effectiveness
 Advanced technology
 In-person connections
 International Networking

Disadvantages
 Format is not ideal for all learners
 Some employers do not accept online degrees
 Requires adaptability to new technologies
 Not all courses required to complete the degree may be offered online
 Lack of motivation
 Can not generate as an alternate learning method
 Distributed learning may not offer immediate feedback
 Distributed learning does not always offer all the necessary courses online
 Internet availability and affordability.
 Distributed learning delivered as programmed instruction:
 Lack of social interaction
 No interaction with teachers and professors
 Lack of seriousness, competition and learning environment
 Programmed instruction may be isolated & separated from daily practice
 Programmed instruction does not give opportunity to work on oral communication skills
 Absence of a teacher or an instructor

Collaboration
Distributed learning relies on collaboration to share knowledge.

Technology
Distributed learning relies on technology to share, store, retrieve, and extend knowledge.

Distributed cognition
Distributed cognition is an outcome of distributed learning (Mindmaps, 2015).

References

Learning methods